Apotoforma fustigera is a species of moth of the family Tortricidae. It is found in Cameroon, Ethiopia and Nigeria.

References

Moths described in 1986
Tortricini
Moths of Africa